The  is a subway line owned and operated by Tokyo Metro in Tokyo, Japan. On average, the line carries 1,447,730 passengers daily (2017), the second highest of the Tokyo Metro network, behind the Tozai Line (1,642,378).

The line was named after the Chiyoda ward, under which it passes. On maps, diagrams and signboards, the line is shown using the color green, and its stations are given numbers using the letter "C".

Overview
The 24.0 km line serves the wards of Adachi, Arakawa, Bunkyō, Chiyoda, Minato and Shibuya, and a short stretch of tunnel in Taitō with no station.

On maps, diagrams and signboards, the line is shown using the color green, and its stations are given numbers using the letter "C".

Trains have through running onto other railway lines on both ends.

Basic data
Distance: 
Double-tracking: Entire line
Railway signalling: New CS-ATC

Station list 
 All stations are located in Tokyo.
 Stopping patterns:
 Commuter Semi Express, Local, Semi Express, and Express trains stop at every station.
 Odakyu Romancecar limited express services stop at stations marked "●" and does not stop at those marked "｜".

Rolling stock
, the following train types are used on the line, all running as ten-car formations unless otherwise indicated.

Tokyo Metro
 16000 series (x37) (since November 2010)
 05 series 3-car trains (x4) (since April 2014, used on Kita-Ayase Branch)

Odakyu
 4000 series (since September 2007)
 60000 series MSE (since spring 2008)

JR East
 E233-2000 series (x19) (since summer 2009)

Former rolling stock
 6000 series (x35) (from 1971 until November 2018)
 JNR 103-1000 series (x16) (from 1971 until April 1986)
 JR East 203 series (x17) (from August 27, 1982 until September 26, 2011)
 JR East 209-1000 series (x2) (from 1999 until October 13, 2018)
 JNR 207–900 series (x1) (from 1986 until December 2009)
 5000 series 3-car trains (x2) (from 1969 until 2014, later used on branch line)
 6000 series 3-car train (x1) (prototype of the series built in 1968 until 2014, used on branch line)
 06 series (x1) (from 1993 until January 2015)
 07 series (x1) (September 2008 – December 2008)
 Odakyu 1000 series (1988–2010)
 Odakyu 9000 series (1978–1990)

History

The Chiyoda Line was originally proposed in 1962 as a line from Setagaya in Tokyo to Matsudo, Chiba; the initial name was "Line 8". In 1964, the plan was changed slightly so that through service would be offered on the Joban Line north of Tokyo, and the number was changed to "Line 9".

Line 9 was designed to pass through built-up areas in Chiyoda, and also intended to relieve the busy Ginza Line and Hibiya Line, which follow a roughly similar route through central Tokyo.
 

This branch primarily serves as a connection to Ayase Depot, but also serves Kita-Ayase Station constructed in the area. A three-car shuttle service operates between Ayase and Kita-Ayase.

The Chiyoda Line was one of the lines targeted in the Aum sarin gas attack on March 20, 1995.

Trains also run from/to  using tracks connecting to the Yurakucho Line.

On March 16, 2019, 10 car services to Kita-Ayase station commenced.

Notes

a. Crowding levels defined by the Ministry of Land, Infrastructure, Transport and Tourism:

100% — Commuters have enough personal space and are able to take a seat or stand while holding onto the straps or hand rails.
150% — Commuters have enough personal space to read a newspaper.
180% — Commuters must fold newspapers to read.
200% — Commuters are pressed against each other in each compartment but can still read small magazines.
250% — Commuters are pressed against each other, unable to move.

References

External links

 Tokyo Metro website

 
Lines of Tokyo Metro
Railway lines in Tokyo
Railway lines opened in 1969
1067 mm gauge railways in Japan
1500 V DC railway electrification